Pandan Jaya is a township in Hulu Langat District, Selangor, Malaysia.

Townships in Selangor

References